

Denebeorht (or Deneberht) was a medieval Bishop of Worcester. He was consecrated perhaps in 800. He died in 822.

Citations

References

External links
 

Bishops of Worcester
822 deaths
9th-century English bishops
Year of birth unknown